Rope (rhythmic gymnastics) may be made of hemp or a synthetic material which retains the qualities of lightness and suppleness. Its length is in proportion to the size of the gymnast. The rope should, when held down by the feet, reach both of the gymnasts' armpits. One or two knots at each end are for keeping hold of the rope while doing the routine. At the ends (to the exclusion of all other parts of the rope) an anti-slip material, either coloured or neutral may cover a maximum of 10 cm (3.94 in). The rope must be coloured, either all or partially. It may be either of a uniform diameter or be progressively thicker in the center provided that this thickening is of the same material as the rope.

The fundamental requirements of a rope routine include leaps and skipping. Other elements include swings, throws, circles, rotations and figures of eight.

Rhythmic gymnastics apparatus